Fadwa Sidi Madane (born 20 November 1994) is a Moroccan middle-distance runner. She competed in the 3000 metres steeplechase event at the 2015 World Championships in Athletics in Beijing, China.

In 2017, she competed in the women's 3000 metres steeplechase event at the 2017 World Championships in Athletics held in London, United Kingdom. She did not advance to compete in the final.

References

External links
 
 
 
 

1994 births
Living people
Moroccan female middle-distance runners
Moroccan female steeplechase runners
World Athletics Championships athletes for Morocco
Place of birth missing (living people)
Athletes (track and field) at the 2016 Summer Olympics
Olympic athletes of Morocco
Athletes (track and field) at the 2018 Mediterranean Games
Mediterranean Games competitors for Morocco
20th-century Moroccan women
21st-century Moroccan women